The Junge Freiheit (JF, "Young Freedom") is a German weekly newspaper on politics and culture that was established in 1986. It has been described as conservative, right-wing, nationalistic and as the "ideological supply ship of right-wing populism" in Germany.

History
JF was founded by students in Freiburg im Breisgau in May 1986 on the initiative of the 19-year-old Dieter Stein. The founders described the newspaper as a reaction to the "dominance of the leftist 68.Generation" among university teachers. In 1993, the newspaper moved its headquarters to Potsdam, near Berlin, and to Hohenzollerndamm, Berlin, in 1995. In 1994, a printing site for the JF in Weimar was firebombed by far-left terrorists, with damage totalling 2.5 million marks. The paper moved to Berlin a few years later, where it has been published ever since. JF had a circulation of 31,161 paid copies in the first quarter of 2020, which was an increase of 28 percent relative to the first quarter of 2015.
In 2016, the British weekly magazine The Economist noted the grown reputation and influence of Junge Freiheit amid the surge of the Alternative for Germany and concluded that "the presence of a right-wing voice in Germany’s media landscape is part of the country’s path to political normality".

Issues and style
The JF has one section for politics, one for culture and for foreign affairs and pays less attention to economics. There is a substantial number of opinions and commentaries, including weekly opinion columns. Every week, the paper also conducts an interview with a prominent politician, author, scientist or artist.

Ruling
JF was involved in a legal battle relating to the freedom of the press against two local State Offices for the Protection of the Constitution in which the newspaper was represented by its lawyer and frequent supporter, the former German Attorney-General Alexander von Stahl (FDP). The Offices for the Protection of the Constitution in two federal states, North Rhine Westphalia and Baden-Württemberg, mentioned Junge Freiheit in their yearly reports of alleged "anti-constitutional activities" between 1995 and 2005, along with most publications and organizations affiliated with the Left Party. The newspaper successfully sued the North Rhine Westphalia local authorities, and the Federal Constitutional Court of Germany ruled the classification to be unconstitutional in 2005 (the so-called "Office for the Protection of the Constitution report case" or "Junge Freiheit Case").

Since then, neither state's report has mentioned the newspaper.

People
The founder and editor-in-chief and managing director of JF is Dieter Stein.

Its prominent contributors include Holger Zastrow, Wolf Jobst Siedler, Frederick Forsyth, Alain de Benoist, Paul Gottfried, Elliot Neaman, Rolf Hochhuth,  Ralph Raico, Derek Turner, Billy Six, Klaus Rainer Röhl and Fritz Schenk. Its prominent public supporters include also Alexander von Stahl and Peter Scholl-Latour.

Gerhard Löwenthal Prize
Together with the German "Foundation for Conservative Education and Research", Junge Freiheit awards the Gerhard Löwenthal Prize, a biannual prize for conservative journalists.

References

External links
 
 Online archive of Junge Freiheit 

1986 establishments in West Germany
Media of Neue Rechte
German-language newspapers
German nationalism
National conservatism
New Right (Europe)
Newspapers published in Berlin
Newspapers established in 1986
Right-wing newspapers
Right-wing populism in Germany
Weekly newspapers published in Germany